The Just and Prosperous People's Party (PRIMA) is a political party in Indonesia. The party formed after a merger of the People's Democratic Party (PRD) and numerous mass organizations. PRIMA's formation was announced on 27 May 2020, gained approval from the Ministry of Law and Human Rights on 29 September 2020, and officially founded on 1 June 2021.

The party promoted nine programs known as the 9 Ways of Justice and Prosperous People: Fair taxation, national industrialization, modern agriculture, strengthening small and medium business enterprises, clean government, progressive advancement of Indonesian peoples, upholding democracy, and gender equality.

Most of the party members and officials during its declaration were PRD cadres and its affiliates. The only exception is R Gautama Wiranegara, a retired major general of Indonesian Army and was a general secretary of National Counter Terrorism Agency.

Due to its connection to the PRD, which was aligned to left-wing politics and had a strong socialist foundation, the party has been attacked and accused as "Neo-Communist" by Islamic right-wing activists or New-Order revivalists. The accusation was dismissed by party officials.

Election postponement 

The party submitted a case to the Central Jakarta District Court on 8 December 2022 after the party was unable to compete in 2024 Indonesian general election, despite the court not having such power. Among the party's demands are: declaring the party is the party which aggrieved by KPU,  ordered General Election Commission to award the party 500 million rupiahs as compensation and the postponement of the election. In an unusual move, the court decided to fulfill all the demands of the party and ordered the General Election Commission to do so on 2 March 2023. The court also ordered the General Election Commission to restart the election process from the verification again. The General Election Commission submitted the appeal over the irregular decision.

Supreme Court of Indonesia, stated that despite the irregularity of the decision, the judges cannot be wronged and asked to the General Election Commission to submit the appeal.

References

2021 establishments in Indonesia
Democratic socialist parties in Asia
Pancasila political parties
Political parties established in 2021
Political parties in Indonesia
Progressive parties in Asia
Socialist parties in Indonesia